About an Old Man, an Old Woman and Their Hen Ryaba is a 1982 Soviet Animation film by Alexander Davydov. This cartoon was filming by Soyuzmultfilm studio. The film received national and international recognition.

Plot summary
The plot of the film is based on the Russian folk tale "Kurochka Ryaba" ("Ryaba the hen"). This tale is told, how a hen laid a golden egg. The Old Man and the Old Woman could not eat The Egg, because The Egg does not contain anything but a gold. They were to be hungry. The Hen laid The Egg Simple. Old Man and Old Woman were able to eat The Simple Egg and praise The Food.

Creators

References

External links
About an Old Man, an Old Woman and Thiere Hen Ryaba at Animator.ru
About an Old Man, an "Old Woman and Thiere Hen Ryaba" at Russian Movie Base "Кинопоиск"(rus)

1982 films
1980s animated short films
Soyuzmultfilm
Soviet animated short films
1980s Russian-language films